Carriage & Wagon Workshop, Jagadhari is in Yamunanagar district of Haryana. It is among the eight workshops operated by Northern Railways.

History
This workshop, earlier known as Wagon Workshop was established by the Northern Railway at Jagadhri, Haryana, in 1952, to carry out the periodical overhauling (POH) of rolling stock, both goods and coaching types.

References

Railway workshops in India
Rail transport in Haryana
Yamunanagar district